Levi Witter Barden (September 3, 1820August 31, 1915) was an American lawyer and Republican politician.  He served five years in the Wisconsin Legislature, representing Columbia County.

Biography
Barden was born on September 3, 1820, in Benton, New York. He graduated from State and National Law School and moved to Portage, Wisconsin in 1852. On November 29, 1853, Barden married Jane R. Corning. They had three children. He died in Flushing, New York on August 31, 1915 and was buried in Portage.

Career
Barden was a member of the Assembly in 1865. He represented the 27th District from 1875 through 1878. Other positions he held include Portage alderman, district attorney of Columbia County, and justice of the peace. Barden was a Republican.

References

People from Benton, New York
People from Portage, Wisconsin
Republican Party Wisconsin state senators
Republican Party members of the Wisconsin State Assembly
Wisconsin city council members
District attorneys in Wisconsin
American justices of the peace
State and National Law School alumni
1820 births
1915 deaths
Burials in Wisconsin
19th-century American judges